Weisiger–Carroll House is a historic home located in Richmond, Virginia. It was built about 1765, and is a two-story, vernacular, frame dwelling.  It sits on a high brick basement, has a gable roof, and exterior end chimneys.  The interior features original woodwork and a Federal style mantel. The house served as a hospital during the American Civil War and more than 100 Confederate soldiers who died there lie buried in a cemetery behind the house. The house was restored in the 1980s.

It was listed on the National Register of Historic Places in 1994.

References

Houses on the National Register of Historic Places in Virginia
Federal architecture in Virginia
Houses completed in 1800
Houses in Richmond, Virginia
National Register of Historic Places in Richmond, Virginia